Legislative elections were held in French Polynesia on 14 October 1962 for the Territorial Assembly. The Democratic Rally of the Tahitian People remained the largest party, but lost its majority in the Assembly, winning 14 of the 30 seats.

Results

Elected members

Aftermath
In the new Council of Government, the Democratic Rally of the Tahitian People had three ministers and the Tahitian Democratic Union two.

References

French
Elections in French Polynesia
Legislative
French
Election and referendum articles with incomplete results